Dikta is an indie rock band from Iceland. They have released five albums thus far.

Biography
In its present incarnation, the group began in 1999. They played in the Icelandic band competition Músíktilraunir in 2000 and were finalists. Dikta's four members have been friends since they were children. Last year they've played on festivals such as In The City in Manchester, the SPOT-festival in Denmark and Iceland Airwaves. Their powerful performance in front of a packed venue at Iceland Airwaves earned them a mention in Rolling Stone Magazine.

Dikta's first album, "Andartak", was released in late 2002. It was released in Iceland by the band members themselves under their own label called Mistak Records. One of its singles reached the top of the Icelandic charts. All three singles, "Taminóra," "Andartak," and "Engin orð," were played frequently on Iceland's largest rock station at the time, X-ið 977. The lyrics on "Andartak" are all in Icelandic.

Dikta released their second album, "Hunting for Happiness" in 2005 in Iceland. The album was produced by Ace from Skunk Anansie and was released by the Sugarcubes-owned label, Smekkleysa SM (Bad Taste). The album artwork was made by Gabríela Friðriksdóttir, who has previously collaborated extensively with Björk.
"Hunting for Happiness" also had four successful singles, "Chloë", "Breaking the Waves", "Someone, Somewhere" and "Losing Every Day". All the singles got heavy airplay on Iceland's rock radio stations X-FM and X-ið 977 as well as Iceland's National Radio (Rás 2), except for "Chloë", which was not played on Rás 2.
The lyrics on "Hunting for Happiness" are in English.
"Hunting for Happiness" was released by Smekkleysa in Denmark in 2006 and UK in 2007.

Their third album is Get It Together (2009). Band members have said in interviews that the album would be a natural progression from their previous album, Hunting for Happiness. The lyrics are in English. The album was released in Germany, Austria and Switzerland by Smarten-Up!, a German indie label from Düsseldorf and distributed by Rough Trade, in March 2010. The album went platinum in Iceland.

After touring extensively throughout Europe in 2010 and 2011, Dikta released their fourth album Trust Me. It was self-produced and released by Kölski in Iceland.

For their fifth album, Easy Street (2015), the band hired German producer Sky van Hoff. The album was recorded in Germany and Iceland and contains 11 songs.

Band members
 Haukur Heiðar Hauksson - guitar, piano and vocals.
Besides his band career, Haukur Heiðar Hauksson has had some performances on his own. Notably he was the featured artist on Ólafur Arnalds's song "A Hundred Reasons" on Ólafur Arnalds 2010 album ...And They Have Escaped the Weight of Darkness. In 2014, he performed "Is It Time" with Helgi Júlíus Óskarsson on Óskarsson's collaborative album Crossroads. The song became the debut single release from the album charting in Iceland.
 Jón Bjarni Pétursson - guitar
 Jón Þór Sigurðsson - drums
 Skúli Z. Gestsson - bass and backing vocals

Discography

Albums
2002: Andartak (Mistak Records)
2005: Hunting for Happiness (Smekkleysa)
2009: Get It Together
2011: Trust Me (Kölski)
2015: Easy Street

Singles
2013: "Talking"
2014: "Nóttin var sú ágæt ein"

External links
 Dikta's site (archive)

Icelandic alternative rock groups